The Gibraltar War Memorial is a First World War monument located on Line Wall Road in the British Overseas Territory of Gibraltar. Also known as the British War Memorial, it was sculpted by Jose Piquet Catoli of Spain and unveiled in 1923. Adjacent to the monument on the esplanade built in 1921 are several memorial tablets, as well as two Russian guns from the Crimean War.

History

The Gibraltar War Memorial, also referred to as the British War Memorial, is located to the west of Line Wall Road in Gibraltar, the British Overseas Territory at the southern end of the Iberian Peninsula. The monument, which commemorates the fallen of the First World War, was sculpted by Jose Piquet Catoli of Barcelona, Spain and was constructed of Carrara marble. The memorial was unveiled by the Governor of Gibraltar, Sir Charles Monro, 1st Baronet (1860–1929), during a ceremony on 27 September 1923. The inscription reads: "To the Memory of all Officers and Seamen of the Gibraltar Straits Patrol Who Gave Their Lives for Their King and Empire in the Great War."

The monument is positioned on an esplanade and steps, west of the City Hall and John Mackintosh Square, upon which there are several inscribed tablets. On one tablet is inscribed: "To Our Heroes of Gibraltar and of the Straits Patrol 1914–1918 This tablet is Dedicated by the Association of Gibraltarian Residents in the Argentine Republic." Another is inscribed with: 

Smith-Dorrien (1858–1930) served as Governor of Gibraltar from 1918 to 1923. The governor had the esplanade and steps built along the Line Wall Curtain for the residents of Gibraltar in 1921. A third tablet's inscription reads:

Adjacent to the monument are two Russian guns that were captured during the Crimean War (1854–1856). The inscription reads: "These Four Russian Guns, Captured in the Crimea 1854—1856, Were Presented to Gibraltar by the British Government 1858." The guns were given to Gibraltar in 1858 for its assistance during that conflict. The other two pieces of artillery are located at the entrance to the Gibraltar Botanic Gardens, also known as the Alameda Gardens.

Gallery

References

External links 

 Photographs of monument, esplanade, tablets, and cannon

World War I memorials
Monuments and memorials in Gibraltar